The 2nd Massachusetts Volunteer Heavy Artillery Regiment was a regimental unit that fought in the American Civil War from 1863 to 1865. Initially formed 28 July 1863 in Readville, Massachusetts with Company A, it was supported with 11 other companies ending with Company M on 24 December 1863 (Company J did not exist).

The 2nd served in the states of Virginia and North Carolina during operations in Plymouth, North Carolina, Kinston, and Virginia.

References

Units and formations of the Union Army from Massachusetts
1863 establishments in Massachusetts
Artillery units and formations of the American Civil War
Military units and formations established in 1863
Military units and formations disestablished in 1865